Kate Lajtha is an ecologist known for her use of stable isotopes to examine biogeochemical cycling in soils.

Education and career 
Lajtha has a B.A. in biology from Harvard University (1979) and earned her Ph.D. from Duke University in botany in 1986. Following her Ph.D. she was a postdoctoral fellow at Ohio State University before joining Boston University in 1987. In 1996 she moved to Oregon State University where she was promoted to Professor in 2010. Lajtha has been Editor-in-Chief of the journal Biogeochemistry since 2002.

Lajtha was elected a fellow of the American Geophysical Union in 2020, and recognized "for sustained impact on long-term soil carbon research and fundamental biogeochemical processes of soil carbon and nitrogen cycling."

Research 

While at Boston University, Lajtha investigated the physiology saguaro cactus and the potential impact of trace elements on saguaros. While she concluded that natural, abiotic factors were causing the death of these cacti, the general public was interested in the research because of the emblematic nature of saguaro cacti in the southwestern United States.

More recently, Lajtha's research centers on nutrient cycling, especially nitrogen, in natural environments and those impacted by humans. In this venue she has examined the input of nitrogen and its attenuation in the environment and examined the availability of nitrogen to different types of plants. She has also worked on the ecology of soil carbon with a particular focus on the impact of detritus on soil organic matter. Lajtha works at the H.J. Andrews Experimental Forest in Oregon  where she leads a study entitled "Detrital Input and Removal Treatment (DIRT), through which undergraduate researchers can participate in research on the role of soils in capturing carbon from the atmosphere.

Selected publications

Awards and honors 
 Murray F. Buell Award for Excellence in Ecology (1996)
Co-recipient of the John Martin Award, Association for the Sciences of Limnology and Oceanography (2018) for Howarth et al. paper
 Fellow, American Geophysical Union (2020)

References

External links 
 

Fellows of the American Geophysical Union
Duke University alumni
Harvard University alumni
Oregon State University faculty
Women ecologists
1957 births
Living people